I Can't Stop may refer to:
I Can't Stop (album), a 2003 album by Al Green
"I Can't Stop" (The Osmonds song), 1967
"I Can't Stop", (Gary Numan song), 1986
"I Can't Stop", a song by The Sinceros, from the 1980 album 2nd Debut
"I Can't Stop", a song by Livin Out Loud, from the 2004 album Then and Now
"I Can't Stop", a song by Flux Pavilion, from the 2010 EP Lines in Wax, sampled by Kanye West and Jay-Z
"I Can't Stop", a song by De-Javu, from the 2001 single album 
I Can't Stop, a 2015 album by BoDeans

See also
Can't Stop (disambiguation)